Charles "Kid" McCoy (October 13, 1872 – April 18, 1940), born Norman Selby, was an American boxer and early Hollywood actor. He claimed the vacant world middleweight title when he scored an upset victory over Tommy Ryan by 15th round knockout.

Overview 
Born in Moscow, Rush County, Indiana, McCoy would eventually weigh , stand , and go on to a record 81 wins (55 by KO, with 6 losses, 9 no decision, and 6 disqualifications). McCoy was noted for his "corkscrew punch" – a blow delivered with a twisting of the wrist. According to McCoy, he learned the punch one evening while resting in someone's barn after a day of riding the rails. He noticed a cat strike at a ball of string and imitated its actions. Whether true or not, McCoy was known as a fast, "scientific" fighter who would cut his opponents with sharp blows. He reportedly would wrap his knuckles in mounds of friction tape, to better cut his opponents faces. He was listed # 1 Light Heavyweight of all time in Fifty Years At Ringside, published in 1958. He was also regarded as a formidable puncher, and was included in Ring Magazine's list of 100 greatest punchers of all time.

Boxing career 
Tommy Ryan was knocked out by Kid McCoy in the 15th round on March 2, 1906.  This bout forms part of the lore of the McCoy legend.  McCoy served as a sparring partner for Ryan, and absorbed many beatings at the hands of his employer.  Ryan was notorious for showing little mercy to his sparring partners.
 As a result, McCoy hated Ryan, and sought revenge.  It is alleged that McCoy, who appeared thin, pale and frail, persuaded Ryan that he was seriously ill before their fight. McCoy, who was famed as a trickster, purportedly rubbed flour on his face so as to appear deathly ill.  Ryan is said to have fallen for the ruse, failed to train properly and was not in top condition for the bout.  Whether true or not, McCoy scored an upset win over Ryan in a fight billed for the American and World 154lbs Middleweight Title.

Another one of McCoy's tactics was demonstrated while McCoy was on a tour of Australia and some other Pacific Islands. To supplement his income, he would take on all comers. McCoy watched him train and noted the man fought in his bare feet. When the fight began, McCoy's corner threw handfuls of tacks into the ring, causing the bare-footed challenger to drop his guard and raise up one foot. As soon as he did so, McCoy lowered the boom on his distracted adversary.

Although slight of build, McCoy captured the world middleweight championship by defeating Dan Creedon. McCoy never defended the title, choosing to abandon the crown to enable him to pursue the world heavyweight championship. Despite his handicap in size, McCoy battled the best heavyweights of his era, and defeated Joe Choynski and Peter Maher. He was defeated by Tom Sharkey and Jim Corbett. The Corbett fight was the subject of controversy, as the ending was suspect and Corbett's estranged wife claimed the bout was fixed.

"The real McCoy" 
 
It was thought that the expression "The Real McCoy" originally referred to Kid McCoy. With regard to this, once again, stories abound. One scenario involves a local tough who bumped into McCoy in a bar. McCoy, who was slight of build and a dapper dresser, did not look like a fighter. The bar room bully reputedly laughed when told the slender fellow he was annoying was Kid McCoy. He then challenged McCoy to fight, and upon reviving from being knocked out allegedly remarked "Oh my God, that was the real McCoy".  However, it is believed that the first publication with this spelling occurred in James S. Bond's 1881 dime novel, The Rise and Fall of the "Union club": or, Boy life in Canada, wherein a character utters, "By jingo! yes; so it will be It's the 'real McCoy,' as Jim Hicks says. Nobody but a devil can find us there." Skeptics, though, point out that Kid McCoy was only nine years old when this was published.

Personal life  
McCoy was married ten times, performed in theater, and went west to California during the birth of the movie industry in Los Angeles. He appeared in films, including a scene fighting Wallace Reid in the 1922 film, The World's Champion.  McCoy was also friends with several movie stars of the day, including Charles Chaplin and director D. W. Griffith, who directed the 1919 silent film, Broken Blossoms, Selby's second film as actor.

Legal Issues
By the early 1920s McCoy was poor, addicted to alcohol and out of the movie industry. At this time he was involved in a romance with a wealthy married woman, Teresa Mors. Eventually she filed for divorce from her husband. The Mors divorce was acrimonious, and dragged on until she was killed by a single gunshot to the head on August 12, 1924, in the apartment she shared with McCoy at 2819 Leeward (Unit 212).

The next morning, a disheveled McCoy robbed and held several people captive at Mrs. Mors' antique shop, and shot one man in the leg after he tried to escape. He also forced at least six other men to remove their trousers, and took their money. McCoy was apprehended and charged with the murder of Mrs. Mors. His trial took place in downtown Los Angeles. McCoy claimed Mrs. Mors committed suicide, while the prosecution claimed he murdered her for financial gain. The jury was split between first degree murder and acquittal. In what is believed to have been a compromise verdict, McCoy was convicted of manslaughter.

McCoy was sent to San Quentin, but was paroled from prison in 1932. Afterwards he worked for Ford Motor Company.

Marriages

Extended family 
Norman Selby was one of six siblings and third oldest. One of his four sisters, Grace Esther Selby (maiden; 1885–1916) was, from 1901 to 1908, married to Charles Thomas Henshall (1862–1928). Norman was an uncle to their daughter, actress Barbara Jo Allen (1906–1974).

Death and legacy
McCoy took his own life in Detroit on April 18, 1940. Even his death was enigmatic.
He committed suicide at the Hotel Tuller in Detroit by an overdose of sleeping pills, leaving a note behind. It read, among other things

In an apparent last attempt to drop his professional moniker, the note was pointedly signed as, "Norman Selby."

British professional wrestler Mark Boothman (the son of wrestler Phil "King Ben" Boothman) adopted the "Kid McCoy" name and won the British Lightweight Championship in 1987, holding it for three years.

Selected filmography and publications

Filmography 
 As actor
1918: The House of Glass
 1919: Eyes of Youth
 1919: Broken Blossoms
 1920: The Fourteenth Man
 1920: The Honey Bee
 1922: The World's Champion
 1922: Oath-Bound
 1922: Tom Mix in Arabia
 1923: April Showers

 As subject
 1989: Brutal Glory, highly fictionalized film, loosely about Norman Selby

Publications 
 As subject
 2002: The Real McCoy, by Darin Strauss; (2002, 2003); ; ; ;  (Dutch language)

Professional boxing record
All information in this section is derived from BoxRec, unless otherwise stated.

Official record

All newspaper decisions are officially regarded as “no decision” bouts and are not counted in the win/loss/draw column.

Unofficial record

Record with the inclusion of newspaper decisions in the win/loss/draw column.

See also 

 List of bare-knuckle boxers
 The Kid's Last Fight

Notes

References

External links 

 
 

1872 births
1940 suicides
Bare-knuckle boxers
Boxers from California
World middleweight boxing champions
Drug-related suicides in Michigan
Fordson High School alumni
American prisoners and detainees
Prisoners and detainees of California
American people convicted of manslaughter
American male boxers
People from Rush County, Indiana
Boxers from Indiana
American male film actors
American male silent film actors
20th-century American male actors